Lavalle or LaValle is a Spanish surname that may refer to
 Juan Lavalle (1797–1841), Argentine military and political figure
 José María Lavalle (1902–1984), Peruvian football forward
 María Lavalle Urbina (1908–1996), Mexican lawyer and politician 
 Paul Lavalle (1908–1997), American conductor, composer, arranger and musician
 Ramón Lavalle (1909–1968), Argentine diplomat and journalist
 Víctor Lavalle (1911–1975), Peruvian Olympic football player
 Adolfo Guido Lavalle (1912–?), Argentine Olympic fencer
 Josefina Lavalle (1924–2009), Mexican ballet dancer, choreographer and ballet director
 Gerald LaValle (1932-2018), American politician
 Kenneth LaValle (born 1939), American politician
 Leonardo Lavalle (born 1967), Mexican Olympic tennis player
 Steven M. LaValle (born 1968), American computer scientist
 Victor LaValle (born 1972), American author
 Jorge Luis Lavalle Maury (born 1975), Mexican politician

Spanish-language surnames

See also 
 Lavalle (disambiguation)